is the twelfth single by Japanese band An Cafe. The single is available in three types, two including different bonus DVDs, and one with a bonus live track. The title track is the second opening theme of the anime series, Darker than Black. "Kakusei Heroism" marks the debut of guitarist Takuya and keyboardist Yuuki after the departure of Bou. The song peaked at No. 13 on the Japanese singles chart and is their biggest selling single.

Track listing

Type A (Regular Edition)
Disc One
"Kakusei Heroism ~The Hero Without a "Name"~" (覚醒ヒロイズム ~The Hero Without a "Name"~)
"Respect Mommy ~Hito no Yaku Tatereba ii Jibun no Tokui na Koto de~" (リスペクトマミー ～人の役　立てればいい　自分の得意なことで～)

Disc Two
"Kakusei Heroism" (覚醒ヒロイズム Music Clip)

Type B (Limited Edition)
Disc One
"Kakusei Heroism ~The Hero Without a "Name"~" (覚醒ヒロイズム ~The Hero Without a "Name"~)
"Respect Mommy ~Hito no Yaku Tatereba ii Jibun no Tokui na Koto de~" (リスペクトマミー ～人の役　立てればいい　自分の得意なことで～)

Disc Two
"Darker Than Black Clip"

Type C (Limited Edition)
"Kakusei Heroism ~The Hero Without a "Name"~" (覚醒ヒロイズム ~The Hero Without a "Name"~)
"Respect Mommy ~Hito no Yaku Tatereba ii Jibun no Tokui na Koto de~" (リスペクトマミー ～人の役　立てればいい　自分の得意なことで～)
"Orange Dream ~Bonds Live Ver~" (オレンジドリーム ～Bonds Live Ver.～)

Personnel
Miku – vocals
Takuya – guitar
Kanon – bass guitar
Yuuki – electronic keyboard
Teruki – drums
Shigeki Kashii – mixing engineer, recording engineer
Gen Okamura – recording engineer
Hiroaki Ohgushi – recording engineer
Yuji Chinone – mastering engineer

References

An Cafe songs
2007 singles
2007 songs
Loop Ash Records singles
Songs written by Kanon (bassist)